The 2003 Kroger St. Jude International was a tennis tournament played on indoor hard courts at the Racquet Club of Memphis in Memphis, Tennessee in the United States that was part of the International Series Gold of the 2003 ATP Tour and of Tier III of the 2003 WTA Tour. The tournament ran from February 16 through February 23, 2003.

Finals

Men's singles

 Taylor Dent defeated  Andy Roddick 6–1, 6–4
 It was Dent's 1st title of the year and the 2nd of his career.

Women's singles

 Lisa Raymond defeated  Amanda Coetzer 6–3, 6–2
 It was Raymond's 1st title of the year and the 42nd of her career.

Men's doubles

 Mark Knowles /  Daniel Nestor defeated  Bob Bryan /  Mike Bryan 6–2, 7–6(7–3)
 It was Knowles' 1st title of the year and the 25th of his career. It was Nestor's 1st title of the year and the 27th of his career.

Women's doubles

 Akiko Morigami /  Saori Obata defeated  Alina Jidkova /  Bryanne Stewart 6–1, 6–1
 It was Morigami's only title of the year and the 1st of her career. It was Obata's only title of the year and the 1st of her career.

External links
 Official website
 ATP Tournament Profile
 WTA Tournament Profile

 
Kroger St. Jude International
Kroger St. Jude International
Kroger St. Jude International
Kroger St. Jude International
Kroger St. Jude International